Live World Tour was the fifth  concert tour by American boy band, Big Time Rush. The tour was in support of Big Time Rush's third studio album 24/Seven released in 2013. The tour began on February 7, 2014 in Grand Prairie, Texas. Ticketing pre-sales for the shows started on December 10, 2013.

Opening acts
Olivia Somerlyn
Valeria Gastaldi (Argentina)
Dre (Ecuador)
Shawn Mendes (North America)

Setlist
"Music Sounds Better with U"
"Windows Down"
"24/Seven"
"Amazing"
"Get Up"
"Song for You"
"Shot in The Dark" 
"Art of Moving On" 
"Like Nobody's Around"
"Na Na Na"
"Nothing Even Matters"
"Worldwide"
"Boyfriend"
"Run Wild"
"Time of Our Life"
"Til I Forget About You"
"Elevate"
"Confetti Falling"
"Big Time Rush" / "City Is Ours"

Shows

References

2014 concert tours
Big Time Rush concert tours